The Horten H.IV was a German tailless flying wing glider in which the pilot was to lie in a prone position to reduce the frontal area, and hence drag. It was designed by Reimar and Walter Horten in Göttingen.  Four were built between 1941 and 1943. They were flown in a number of unofficial competitions in Germany during World War II. After the war the flying examples were transported to the United Kingdom and the United States where several contest successes were achieved.

The H.IV was allocated the RLM ID number 8-251 and by inference Horten Ho 251 though this was little used in practice.

Specifications

See also

References

Further reading

1940s German sailplanes
Flying wings
Prone pilot aircraft
H04
Aircraft first flown in 1941